Nokian Palloseura (abbreviated NoPS) is a sports club from Nokia, Finland. The men's football first team currently plays in the Kolmonen (Third Division) and their home ground is at the Nokian keskuskenttä. The floorball team plays in the Second Division.

Background

The club was formed in 1968 and has provided for a number of sports including football, floorball, futsal, ice-hockey, table tennis, squash and basketball.  The most successful section has been basketball between 1976 and 1993 but operations were then transferred to BC Nokia who currently compete in Division 1.

Football

Season to season

Club Structure

Nokian Palloseura run a number of teams including 2 men's teams, 1 men's veterans team and 12 boys teams.  The club has 339 registered players and is the eighth largest football club in Tampere district. The club also run a soccer school.

2010 season

NoPS Men's Team are competing in the Kolmonen section administered by the Tampere SPL.  This is the fourth highest tier in the Finnish football system.  In 2009 NoPS finished in fifth place in the Kolmonen.

NoPS 2 are participating in Section 3 (Lohko 3) of the Kutonen administered by the Tampere SPL.

References and sources
Official Website
Finnish Wikipedia
Suomen Cup
NoPS Jalkapallo Facebook

Football clubs in Finland
Nokia, Finland
1968 establishments in Finland